Enver Hadžihasanović (born 7 July 1950) is a former Bosnian chief of staff of the Army of the Republic of Bosnia and Herzegovina and convicted war criminal.

Biography 
Hadžihasanović was born in Zvornik in 1950 in the SR Bosnia and Herzegovina.

Military career
Hadžihasanović graduated from the military academy in Belgrade in 1973. He then was transferred to the military stations in Tuzla and Sarajevo. As captain first class he led the command in the military academy in Belgrade. After that school closed, he was given the rank of major and commanded the battalion of the military police of the 7th Army in 1988. After a while he was given the command of the 49th Motorized Brigade. That brigade was later transformed into a mechanized brigade; at the end of 1989 he was the commander of that brigade, with the rank of lieutenant colonel.

Military house confinement
In the beginning of April 1992, Hadžihasanović was sentenced to military house confinement in Sarajevo by the Yugoslav People's Army, after which he deserted the JNA.

Bosnian war
After Enver quit the JNA, he joined the Territorial Defence Force of the Republic of Bosnia and Hercegovina (TO RBiH) of Bosnia. On 14 November 1992 Enver became the commander of the 3rd Corps of the Army of the Republic of Bosnia and Herzegovina (ARBiH). He held that position until 1 November 1993 when he became the exchange chief of staff of the high command of the ARBiH.

After the war
From 1996 to 2000, when he retired, Hadžihasanović was a member of the Chief of Staff of the Federation Army of Bosnia and Herzegovina.

War crimes
Hadzihasanović was found guilty for failing to prevent the death of a prisoner of war and cruel treatment, on the basis of superior criminal responsibility and sentenced to five years in prison. He appealed against the first-instance judgment and was released provisionally in June 2007 pending the judgement of the Appeals Chamber. On 22 April 2008 the United Nations International Criminal Tribunal for the former Yugoslavia (ICTY) reduced his sentence to 3½ years.

Military ranks

Yugoslav People's Army
1973 – Captain first class
1988 – Major
1989 – Lieutenant colonel

Army of the Republic of Bosnia and Herzegovina
1993 – Brigadier general
1997 – Division general
1998 – Major general

References

1950 births
Living people
People from Zvornik
Bosniaks of Bosnia and Herzegovina
Bosnia and Herzegovina Muslims
Bosniaks of Bosnia and Herzegovina convicted of war crimes
Bosnia and Herzegovina generals
Army of the Republic of Bosnia and Herzegovina soldiers
People convicted by the International Criminal Tribunal for the former Yugoslavia
Bosnia and Herzegovina people imprisoned abroad
Officers of the Yugoslav People's Army